The eleventh series of British reality television series The Apprentice (UK) was broadcast in the UK on BBC One, from 14 October to 20 December 2015; due to the 2015 General Election being held in Spring, which Alan Sugar had ties to, the BBC postponed the series' broadcast until the middle of Autumn. This series saw Claude Littner, an interviewer during the Interviews stage of a series, being announced as Lord Sugar's new aide, after Nick Hewer made his departure from the programme after the last series. Alongside the standard twelve episodes, with the first two aired within a day of each other, the series was preceded by the mini online episode "Meet the Candidates" on 6 October, with two specials aired alongside the series – "The Final Five" on 9 December, and "Why I Fired Them" on 16 December.

One notable change brought into the series involved increasing the number of candidates taking part, with Sugar promising a more varied arrangement of older and "serious" participants for his investment. As a result, eighteen candidates took part in the eleventh series, with Joseph Valente becoming the overall winner. Excluding the specials, the series averaged around 7.18 million viewers during its broadcast.

Series overview 
Production staff found they could not hold episodes for the eleventh series during Spring 2015, as a general election, typically held by the British government during the Spring months, had been called for during 2014. As Alan Sugar had political ties due to his appointment within the House of Lords, and had previously highlighted potential problems for the BBC if they aired the programme during this key political event, both the production and broadcasting schedules had to be reworked to avoid potential problems. Due to Nick Hewer departing the programme following its tenth series, Sugar's search for his replacement led to him deciding to offer the role to Claude Littner. Discussions with production staff led to an agreement towards this decision, while allowing Littner to oversee interviews towards the penultimate stage of the process. In addition to this, a fourth interviewer needed to be recruited to work alongside Littner, Mike Soutar, and Claudine Collins, leading to the role being offered by Sugar to Linda Plant.

To keep the programme fresh, production staff search for candidates saw two significant changes, after applications were made available towards the end of the tenth series' broadcast – they were made to focus on applicants who were older and more experienced in business, and those brought in for interviews and auditions during January – February 2015 were whittled down until around eighteen were finalised for the eleventh series. Filming took place from mid-Spring to early Summer, with the first task seeing them form into mixed gender teams – while one team named themselves "Versatile", the other named themselves "Connexus". This series is notable for being the first in which a project manager of the losing team was fired during their internal review, and the only series to date in which a candidate who was fired refused to appear on sister show You're Fired – due to criticism against her portrayal on the show, Selina Waterman-Smith refused to be involved in discussions over her performance in the series. The eleventh series also drew media attention over the departure of Scott Saunders – while not the first to quit the show despite having secured his place in the next stage of the process, media reports widely reported that his sudden decision to leave caught producers by surprise.

Of those who took part, Joseph Valente would become the eventual winner, going on to use his prize to start up and expand a plumbing business called Impra-Gas. He would work together with Sugar to develop the company's business model for two years, before announcing his intentions to go solo and assume full control of the company in early 2017, with both men parting on good terms.

Candidates

Performance chart 

Key:
 The candidate won this series of The Apprentice.
 The candidate was the runner-up.
 The candidate won as project manager on his/her team, for this task.
 The candidate lost as project manager on his/her team, for this task.
 The candidate was on the winning team for this task / they passed the Interviews stage.
 The candidate was on the losing team for this task.
 The candidate was brought to the final boardroom for this task.
 The candidate was fired in this task.
 The candidate lost as project manager for this task and was fired.
 The candidate left the competition after this task.

Episodes

Controversy

Selina Waterman-Smith 
During and after filming of a series of The Apprentice, production staff are required to ensure that candidates partaking in that year's contest behave appropriately off-camera, despite reports from Selina of bullying from two other female candidates. The involvement of Selina Waterman-Smith in the eleventh series caused controversy after complaining about the conditions candidates were kept in. Selina Waterman-Smith accused producers on Twitter during the series' broadcast that she was being unfairly treated as a "pantomime villain", and refused to take any part with the sister show You're Fired following the episode featuring her dismissal.

Richard Woods' health 
As a rule for those making applications to be a part of The Apprentice, all medical information pertaining to themselves must be made available to production staff to assess if they can be involved in a new series. Following his involvement in the eleventh series, Richard Woods revealed in an interview that he had not disclosed this information, allowing him to perform in the contest despite the fact he had suffered three mini-strokes and had delayed a procedure to preserve his sight in his left eye. His revelation raised questions over the work of the programme's researchers, though it was later stated that despite his non-disclosure, production staff ensure all candidates have access to good healthcare, and that the show's doctor had seen no issues for Woods to take part in the series.

Ratings 
Official episode viewing figures are from BARB.

References

External links 
 Official site BBC

11
2015 British television seasons